61 Mechanised Battalion Group was a unit of the South African Infantry Corps; although it was classed as mechanized infantry, it was a combined arms force consisting of infantry, armour and artillery.

History

Combat Group Juliet
General Constand Viljoen, Chief of the Army, formulated a plan in 1978 to introduce a mechanized combat group to Ovamboland in the then South West Africa, to conduct operations against SWAPO.
Combat Group Juliet was then formed under the command of Commandant Frank Bestbier.

Operation Reindeer
The Battle Group first saw action in Operation Reindeer in early May 1978, launching an attack on SWAPO’s Western Front headquarters and logistics base, at Chetequera, 15 km north of the South West African border, with a mechanized assault force. This attack formed part of Operation Reindeer during which paratroopers attacked a separate target at Cassinga, some 300 km into Angola.
After Operation Reindeer it was decided to establish a permanent conventional mechanized combat unit in the operational area and Commandant Johann Dippenaar was appointed to set up this unit.

By January 1979, the Battle Group was renamed 61 Mechanised Battalion and became part of the regular order of battle. 61 Mech served for over a decade in the territory fighting both a guerrilla war against the South-West Africa People's Organisation, as well as taking part in conventional operations against Cuban and Angolan forces.

South West Africa Headquarters of 61 Mech
A tactical headquarters for 61 Mech was initially established at Otavi but during April 1979 this was moved to Tsumeb. 61 Mech was eventually resettled at Omuthiya, with a base headquarters in Tsumeb.

Further operations
61 Mech was primarily involved in these operations.

 Operation Carrot (1979)
 Operation Sceptic (1980)
 Operation Protea (1981)
 Operation Daisy (1981)
 Operation Meebos (1982)
 Operation Yahoo (1982)
 Operation Dolfyn (1983)
 Operation Askari (1983)
 Operation Vasvat (1984)
 Operation Nekomdraai (1984)
 Operation Pronkertjie (1985)
 Operation Viper (1985)
 Operation Benzine
 Operation Moduler
 Operation Hooper
 Operation Packer
 Operation Excite (1988)
 Operation Linger
 Operation Merlyn (1989)
 Operation Arson I 
 Operation Arson II
 Operation Light Foot
 Operation Ventic
 Operation Pikadel
 Operation Reward
 Operation Displace
 Operation Jamba
 Operation Hulti (1988)
 Operation Prone (1988)
 Operation Makro (1981)

Relocation to South Africa and Lohatla Army Battle School
During September 1991 61 Mech Bn Gp, which was based at Rooikop in Namibia, resettled at the Army Battle School in Lohatla, South Africa. 61 Mech remained part of C Army’s Reserve, under operational command of 60 Brigade HQ and administratively supported by the Army Battle School. During this time, C Army amended the organisation of the Battle School to execute two functions concurrently: 
 first, continuing to administer the facility as a large training institution for reserves and full-time forces as it had been in the past; 
 second, to provide the headquarters for a virtual Rapid Deployment Force (including 61 Mech), as part of its permanent order of battle.

Operations after relocation
61 Mech was primarily involved in these operations.

 Operation Shobashobane
 Operation Intexo (1995)
 Operation Jumbo III (1996)
 Operation Vlakhaas (1995)
 Operation Sweepslag (1994)
 Operation Sombre (1994)

Disbandment
By 2005, 61 Mech was disbanded and its infantry elements merged into 8 South African Infantry Battalion at Upington after moving from Lohatla. The Armour and Artillery components were merged into other existing regular units of their respective corps.

Organisation
61 Mech was organised along the following lines:

 two infantry companies, which were equipped with the Ratel-20 Infantry Fighting Vehicle, 
 if necessary, a third infantry company was attached. On many occasions this was a company from 1 Parachute Battalion who were attached as a motorised company in Buffels
 an armoured car squadron initially equipped with Eland Armoured Cars. During 1980 the Elands were replaced by the Ratel-90 and later the Rooikat Armoured Fighting Vehicle, 
 a support company consisting of an anti-tank platoon in Ratel-90s, 
 an 81mm mortar platoon in Ratel-81s,
 an anti-aircraft troop and 
 an artillery battery equipped with the G5 howitzer. Firepower was further augmented by the addition of the self-propelled version (G6 Rhino). 
 In 1988 61 Mech also received the first combat-deployed squadron of Olifant MBTs, to counter the ever-escalating FAPLA tank threat

61 Mech was primarily tasked as the Army's Immediate Response Unit, due to its versatility.

Equipment

Armour
Eland 60
Eland 90
Olifant MBT

Armoured Personnel Carrier
Buffel
Casspir

Artillery
G2
G5
G6

Anti Aircraft
Ystervark

Personal Weapons
R1
R4
R5
FN Mag
60mm patrol mortar
RPG

Fighting Vehicles
Ratel 20
Ratel 60
Ratel 81
Ratel 90
Ratel Command
Ratel ZT3

Logistics
samil 10 lappiespomp
Samil 20
Samil 50
Samil 100
Rinkhals ambulance

Insignia

Standard Dress

Ops Badge 

61 Mech awarded a small badge called the Operational Badge for those in or attached to the unit who deployed with the unit on operational duties. The badge had a yellow backing and was awarded initially only for cross border operations into Angola. A subsequent version with a green backing was suggested which was to be for internal duties. This version was never authorised and the yellow badge was awarded for all operational deployments. The badge consisted of a dagger with three diagonal lightning bolts in red across it. A subdued version was produced for wear on nutria (brown's) uniforms. With the introduction of camouflage, a new version was produced on green thatching.

This knife point always faced the heart of the wearer.

Companies 
Each company or element in the Battalion (group) had its own flag and identifying badge.

Leadership

Honoris Crux recipients

Battle Honours

Further developments
From 61 Mech's success, 62 Mechanised Battalion Group and 63 Mechanised Battalion Group, were developed, encompassing similar battlegroup principles.

Theoretically the three units would have formed 60 Brigade, South Africa's highly mobile brigade level response to a full conventional attack on South West Africa.

See also

Notes

References

Other sources

External links 

 

Battalions of South Africa
Military units and formations established in 1978
Military units and formations disestablished in 2005
Military units and formations of South Africa in the Border War